Hyseni is a surname. Notable people with the surname include:

Berat Hyseni (born 1986), Kosovar footballer
Erald Hyseni (born 1999), Albanian footballer
Klaudio Hyseni (born 1994), Albanian footballer
Skënder Hyseni (born 1955), Kosovar Albanian politician

Albanian-language surnames